The Holy City Zoo, which called itself "the comedian's clubhouse", was a small but influential comedy club in San Francisco that operated from the mid-1970s to the mid-1990s.

Description
The Holy City Zoo was located at 408 Clement Street between 5th and 6th Avenues in San Francisco's Richmond District. It was a tiny dark cavern that had a maximum occupancy of 78. The bar sold beer, wine and soft drinks. There was a small stage set against the back wall. A few stairs stage left led to a small balcony known as "The John Wilkes Booth."

History
The club got its name from a sign the first owner, Robert Steger, picked up for free at a going-out-of-business sale at the local zoo in Holy City, California. He had stopped there to buy redwood tables and chairs for the club.

At that time, the Holy City Zoo was a folk music club. The first comedian to play the club on an open mic night was Jim Giovanni, an impressionist, circa 1971. There was no comedy scene at the Holy City Zoo prior to Giovanni's appearance, and he remained at that locale performing comedy nightly for close to three years. Later, other comics looking for a venue found the Zoo and gradually crowded out the folk music.

In 1975, Steger sold the business to Peter Reines. At first the Zoo continued to offer folk music five nights a week and was closed on Sundays.  Reines was approached by San Francisco musician/comedian Jose Simon, who suggested adding stand-up comedy as another form of entertainment.  A number of comedians were holding shows in the basement of a church and wanted more of a nightclub setting.  Sundays became "open mike" nights. It promptly became a very popular event.  Gradually, comedy was expanded to seven nights a week.  Under the promotional and emceeing skills of Tony DePaul, the Zoo gained national and international recognition. The club's first official comedy producer/club manager was John Cantu, who often slept on the stage after the club had closed for the evening.

Open-mike nights continually ran one or two nights a week throughout the club's existence. Anyone could sign up for a five-minute set, including some comedians who went on to be stars.

It continued as a full-time comedy club for nearly 20 years. The Zoo was a "clubhouse" of sorts for comedians; it was the destination for many after a gig to hang out, gossip, drink, complain about the business, and perhaps catch a glimpse of some big-time headliner working on new material (most notably, Robin Williams, "who used the club as his neighborhood rehearsal space").  Television producer George Schlatter first saw Williams when he performed at Holy City, and remarked of him "...because people could not believe what they were seeing. It was character after character and that unbelievable machine-gun delivery". Rob Schneider could often be spotted hovering outside the club waiting to go onstage because he was underage. Due to a changing neighborhood and the lack of a full liquor license, the club was never financially solvent, and changed ownership many times. Among the various people who owned or co-owned the Zoo were Steger, Reines, Cantu, Jason Cristoble, Tom Sawyer, talent manager Bob Fisher, comedian Jim Samuels, and, at the end, Gilda and George Forrester (parents of the Zoo's last manager, Tracy Forrester) and Will and Debi Durst (who retained the rights to the "Holy City Zoo" trademark).

The Zoo went out of business at least once in the 1980s, reopening briefly as the Ha-Ha-A-Go-Go (under Tom Sawyer). In 1988, several comedians from the club had been recorded for the making of a George Schlatter-produced two-hour TV special The Comedy Club Special, hosted by Dudley Moore. The Holy City Zoo finally closed for good in 1994 and became a karaoke bar. In the later years, Holy City Zoo had been co-owned by Bob Fisher and Jim Samuels, the latter being the 1982 winner of the San Francisco International Comedy Competition. The final closing of the Zoo was a 24-hour "farewell marathon" hosted by Jeremy S. Kramer and ran from midnight August 29 to midnight August 30. Robin Williams said of the club's demise "like someone pulling the life support on your aunt. It's depressing. The Zoo was the womb".

On January 18, 1996, the club was temporarily revived as the non-profit "The New Zoo" for weekly open-mic nights on Thursdays at its original location (now called Seaport Tavern). Co-owner Jim Samuels died in 1990 at age 41 so only co-owner Bob Fisher was present and promoting the new revival.

On April 20, 2011, Bay Area comedy troupe Sylvan Productions began hosting a weekly Wednesday night stand up open mic, and regular Saturday feature showcases at Dirty Trix Saloon, bringing comedy back to the historical location.

List of past performers

The following is a partial list of comedians and other performers who either got their start or had performances at the Holy City Zoo:

Robin Williams
The Amazing Johnathan
Kevin Nealon
Bill Rafferty
Bobby Slayton
Carrie Snow
Aisha Tyler
Marc Maron
Patton Oswalt
Blaine Capatch
Greg Proops

References

Defunct comedy clubs in the United States
Entertainment venues in San Francisco
Culture of San Francisco
Comedy clubs in California